Abakumov (masculine) or Abakumova (feminine) is a Russian surname. Variants of this surname include Abakishin/Abakishina (/), Abakulov/Abakulova (/), Abakumkin/Abakumkina (/), Abakushin/Abakushina (/), Abakshin/Abakshina (/), Abbakumov/Abbakumova (/), Avakumov/Avakumova (/), Avvakumov/Avvakumova (/), and possibly Bakulin/Bakulina (/) and Bakunin/Bakunina (/).

All these surnames derive from a patronymic which itself is derived from various forms of the Christian male first name Avvakum.

People with the surname
Boris Abakumov, Soviet Korean War flying ace
Dmitry Abakumov (born 1989), Russian association football player
Ekaterina Avvakumova (born 1990), Russian and Soviet Korean biathlete
Igor Abakoumov (Abakumov) (born 1981), Soviet-born Belgian professional road bicycle racer
Irina Avvakumova (born 1991), Russian ski jumper
Mariya Abakumova (born 1986), Russian Olympic javelin thrower
Viktor Abakumov (1908–1954), Soviet security official

Toponyms
Abakumova, alternative name of Abbakumovo, a village in Fedoskinskoye Rural Settlement of Mytishchinsky District in Moscow Oblast;

See also
Abakumovo, several rural localities in Russia
Abbakumovo, several rural localities in Russia

References

Notes

Sources
И. М. Ганжина (I. M. Ganzhina). "Словарь современных русских фамилий" (Dictionary of Modern Russian Last Names). Москва, 2001. 

Russian-language surnames
